Acton is a village in Shropshire, England, south of Bishop's Castle.

External links

Villages in Shropshire